The 1997 Conference USA baseball tournament was the 1997 postseason baseball championship of the NCAA Division I Conference USA, held at Turchin Stadium in New Orleans, Louisiana, from May 13 through 18.  defeated  in the championship game, earning the conference's automatic bid to the 1997 NCAA Division I baseball tournament.

With the completion of Houston's move from the Southwest Conference, the conference expanded to 10 teams in baseball. As a result, the tournament's play-in round was expanded to include the 7th–10th seeds, instead of only the 8th and 9th.

Regular season results 

 Records reflect conference play only.

Bracket

Play-in games 
Two play-in games among the four teams with the worst regular season records decided which two teams would have the final two spots in the eight-team double-elimination bracket.

Double-elimination 

 Bold indicates the winner of the game.
 Italics indicate that the team was eliminated from the tournament.

All-tournament team

References 

Tournament
Conference USA Baseball Tournament
Conference USA baseball tournament
Conference USA baseball tournament
1990s in New Orleans
College baseball tournaments in Louisiana
Baseball competitions in New Orleans